The 2022 season for the  team is its 12th season overall, of which all of them have been at UCI WorldTeam level, and the seventh season under the current name. The team's title sponsors are Trek, an American bicycle manufacturer, and Segafredo, an Italian coffee brand. They also use SRAM drivetrain, Bontranger wheels and Santini clothing.

Team roster 

Riders who joined the team for the 2022 season

Riders who left the team during or after the 2021 season

Season victories

National, Continental, and World Champions

Notes

References

External links 

 

Trek-Segafredo men
2022
Trek-Segafredo men